Matthew John Tipton (born 29 June 1980) is a Welsh football manager and former professional player. He is currently the manager of NIFL Championship side Ards

Club career
Tipton started his career at Oldham Athletic moving up through the Youth ranks and making his debut aged just 17. In 2002, he moved on to League Two side Macclesfield Town, where he enjoyed his most prolific spell.

This was followed by a brief, unhappy spell with Mansfield Town, before moving back to the North-West of England with Bury.

After his time at Bury came to an end he dropped out of the Football League and joined Conference North side Hyde United. A season later moved to local rivals Droylsden. He scored the only goal of the game in Droylsden's 1–0 giant-killing victory over league side Darlington. On 18 July 2009 he returned to Macclesfield Town as trialist and played in the 3–0 pre-season defeat to Middlesbrough. He signed a one-year deal with Macclesfield on 24 July 2009.

He left the club, along with 10 other players at the end of the 2009–10 season.

He signed for Dundalk of The League of Ireland on 29 July 2010. It was the first time in his career that he had played outside of Britain. He signed for the 2010 campaign, and made his league debut in the defeat at Sligo Rovers. On 13 September 2010 Tipton scored a hat trick helping Dundalk win 5–1 against league toppers Shamrock Rovers .

In December 2010 he signed for Portadown on an 18-month deal with the option for another 12 months. He was the club's leading scorer for the 2011–12 season with 27 goals.

He signed for Linfield in May 2012 on a two-year contract, and in 2014 joined Ballymena United. He scored 19 goals for the Sky Blues in his debut season. On 24 March 2016, Tipton, having had trouble recovering from a knee injury, left Ballymena. Upon leaving the club, he stated that he was keen to explore alternative options in football.

International career
Tipton is a former Wales under-21 international player.

Management career
Tipton went into management in 2016, taking the reins from long-serving Warrenpoint Town manager Barry Gray, who had managed the club from the Mid-Ulster Football League into the NIFL Premiership, but had been relegated to the NIFL Championship by the time he stood down. In his first season, Tipton's side claimed the Championship and the Mid-Ulster Cup.

Tipton resigned the Warrenpoint manager's post on 28 February 2018, and later that day was announced as the new manager of Portadown on a two and a half year contract.

Honours

As a player
With Droylsden

Manchester Premier Cup :1
2008-09

With Linfield

County Antrim Shield :1
2013-14

With Ballymena United

County Antrim Shield :1
2015-16

As a manager
With Warrenpoint Town

NIFL Championship :1
2016-17

Mid-Ulster Cup :1
2016-17

With Portadown F.C.

NIFL Championship :1 2019-20

References

External links

1980 births
Living people
Footballers from Bangor, Gwynedd
Association football forwards
Welsh footballers
Oldham Athletic A.F.C. players
Macclesfield Town F.C. players
Mansfield Town F.C. players
Bury F.C. players
Hyde United F.C. players
Droylsden F.C. players
Dundalk F.C. players
English Football League players
League of Ireland players
NIFL Premiership players
Portadown F.C. players
Warrenpoint Town F.C. players
Ballymena United F.C. players